Ivan Gavran (born 12 April 1980) is a former Serbian footballer who played for Napredak Kruševac and Dobrudzha Dobrich amongst other clubs.

Born in Pristina (SR Serbia, SFR Yugoslavia), he previously played with FK Priština in the First League of FR Yugoslavia, FK Napredak Kruševac Austrian second division with FC Kärnten, Bosnia and Herzegovina with NK Žepče, PFC Spartak Varna, Bulgarian third division with PFC Dobrudzha Dobrich., Serbian League West with Šumadija Radnički. Since ending his playing career he has become youth team coach at FK Župa Aleksandrovac.

References

External links
 Ivan Gavran at Srbijafudbal

1980 births
Living people
Kosovo Serbs
Sportspeople from Pristina
Serbian footballers
FC Prishtina players
FK Napredak Kruševac players
FK Radnički 1923 players
FC Kärnten players
Expatriate footballers in Austria
PFC Spartak Varna players
PFC Dobrudzha Dobrich players
Expatriate footballers in Bulgaria
NK Žepče players
Expatriate footballers in Bosnia and Herzegovina
Serbian expatriate sportspeople in Bulgaria
FK Skopje players
Expatriate footballers in North Macedonia
Association football forwards